Goniorhynchus calamitalis is a moth in the family Crambidae. It was described by Snellen in 1898. It is found in Indonesia (Lombok, Java).

References

Moths described in 1898
Spilomelinae